is a railway station on the Hakodate Main Line in Iwamizawa, Hokkaido, Japan, operated by Hokkaido Railway Company (JR Hokkaido). The station is numbered A11.

Lines
Horomui Station is served by the Hakodate Main Line.

Station layout
The station consists of one side platform and one island platform serving three tracks, with the station situated above the tracks. The station has automated ticket machines, automated turnstiles which accept Kitaca, and a "Midori no Madoguchi" staffed ticket office.

Platforms

Adjacent stations

See also
 List of railway stations in Japan

References

Railway stations in Hokkaido Prefecture
Railway stations in Japan opened in 1882